David L. Lander (born David Leonard Landau, June 22, 1947 – December 4, 2020) was an American actor, comedian, musician, and baseball scout. He was best known for his portrayal of Andrew "Squiggy" Squiggman in the ABC sitcom Laverne & Shirley. He also served as a goodwill ambassador for the National Multiple Sclerosis Society.

Early life

David Leonard Landau was born  in Brooklyn, New York, the youngest son of two Jewish schoolteacher parents, Stella (Goldman) and Saul Landau.

Lander decided to become an actor when he was 10. He studied to become an actor at the High School for the Performing Arts and continued at Carnegie Tech and New York University. It was in high school he took the stage name of David Lander, which he would later legally adopt, after a classmate "borrowed" his real name to register with an actors' union.

Career
He was best known for his role as Andrew Helmut "Squiggy" Squiggman on the situation comedy Laverne & Shirley from 1976 to 1982 along with sitcom sidekick Lenny, played by Michael McKean.

Lander's partnership with McKean began during their acting classes at Carnegie Mellon University in Pittsburgh, where they developed the characters of Lenny and Squiggy. Lander's character went through a name change because producers felt that there were already too many Italian characters in the cast of Laverne & Shirley. Therefore, Anthony Squiggliano became Andrew Helmut "Squiggy" Squiggman.

After Pittsburgh, they teamed up in the Los Angeles-based comedy ensemble The Credibility Gap. The duo released an album as Lenny and the Squigtones in 1979 featuring Christopher Guest on guitar, credited as Nigel Tufnel, a name Guest would later reuse in the spoof rock band Spinal Tap. Lander and McKean also appeared together in the 1979 Steven Spielberg comedy 1941, and the 1980 Kurt Russell film Used Cars.  Lander and McKean lent their vocal talents to the animated TV series Oswald, which ran from 2001 to 2003.  Lander and McKean voiced the characters of the penguin cousins Henry and Louie, respectively.

Lander also appeared in numerous other TV shows and movies, including The Bob Newhart Show, Barney Miller, Happy Days (as Squiggy), Viva Valdez, Married... with Children, Twin Peaks, On the Air, The Weird Al Show, Mad About You, Pacific Blue, and The Drew Carey Show. His film roles included the part of a minor league baseball radio announcer in the film A League of Their Own and a bit part of the minister officiating the marriage ceremony in Say It Isn't So. He also played "Tanning Intruder" in Christmas with the Kranks. Lander created the starring role of the demented fast-food franchise clown Bruce Burger in the cult film Funland, directed by Michael A. Simpson.

Lander's voice acting roles included the "dramatic reproduction" of Elvis Presley quotations for the Pop Chronicles music documentary and the voice of Jerry Lewis in the Filmation series Will the Real Jerry Lewis Please Sit Down in 1970. He voiced "Doc Boy" Arbuckle, the farm-boy brother of Jon Arbuckle, in most animated adaptations of the Garfield franchise. Later voice roles included The Big Bang, A Bug's Life, Tattooed Teenage Alien Fighters from Beverly Hills, Oswald, Titan A.E., Tom and Jerry: The Movie and the animated TV series Galaxy High as the six-armed Milo de Venus. In 2002, he reprised his role as Squiggy in the animated sitcom The Simpsons. Lander was the voice of Smart Ass, the chief weasel of Judge Doom's Toon Patrol in the 1988 Disney film Who Framed Roger Rabbit. Lander reprised his role as Smart Ass on the related ride, but the character was renamed Wiseguy. He was credited as Stephen Lander in Boo, Zino & the Snurks. One of his later roles was that of Ch'p in the DC Comics animated movie Green Lantern: First Flight.

He played the psychiatrist in the video for "Why's Everybody Always Pickin' on Me?" by The Bloodhound Gang.

Multiple sclerosis diagnosis and activism
Lander had multiple sclerosis. Diagnosed on May 15, 1984, at Cedars-Sinai Medical Center, he went public in 1999 and regularly spoke at related conventions. In 2002, his autobiography was published, titled Fall Down Laughing: How Squiggy Caught Multiple Sclerosis and Didn't Tell Nobody, written with Lee Montgomery.

Sports
Lander, a Pittsburgh Pirates fan, had a small stake in the Portland Beavers. In 1997, He began work as a baseball talent scout, first for the Anaheim Angels, and later for the Seattle Mariners. He was a member of the Society of American Baseball Research, the baseball sabermetrics organization, for many years.

Death
Lander died of complications from multiple sclerosis at Cedars-Sinai Medical Center in Los Angeles, California, on December 4, 2020. He was 73 years old.

Filmography

Film credits

Television credits

Video games credits

References

External links
 
 
 [ Lenny and the Squigtones at allmusic]
 
 David Lander at Find a Grave

1947 births
2020 deaths
American male comedians
American male film actors
American male television actors
American male voice actors
Burials at Hollywood Forever Cemetery
Carnegie Mellon University College of Fine Arts alumni
Deaths from multiple sclerosis
Fiorello H. LaGuardia High School alumni
Jewish American male actors
Male actors from New York City
Neurological disease deaths in California
New York University alumni
Writers from Brooklyn
21st-century American comedians
20th-century American male actors
21st-century American male actors